Lise Marianne Justesen (born 5 September 1961) is a Danish rower. She competed at the 1980 Summer Olympics and the 1984 Summer Olympics.

References

1961 births
Living people
Danish female rowers
Olympic rowers of Denmark
Rowers at the 1980 Summer Olympics
Rowers at the 1984 Summer Olympics
Sportspeople from Odense